Paul Edward Galanti (born July 11, 1939) is a retired Commander in the United States Navy and Naval Aviator.  Serving on active duty from 1962 to 1982, he was a Prisoner of War from 1966 to 1973 during the Vietnam War. He was also a member of the Swift Boat Veterans for Truth, and the 2nd commissioner of the Virginia Department of Veterans Services.  He was married to the former Phyllis Eason, who died on April 23, 2014. He has two grown sons.

Career
Galanti grew up in an Army family; his relatives had served in Japan, France, Turkey and Germany. He graduated from Valley Forge Military Academy in 1957 and the U. S. Naval Academy in 1962, where he was the president of his class. Upon graduation, he immediately entered Navy flight training at Naval Air Station, Pensacola, Florida. Following completion of advanced jet training in November 1963, he became a jet flight instructor in Pensacola as a Selective Retrained Graduate (SERGRAD) of flight training. The following year, he completed fleet replacement training in the A-4 Skyhawk at Attack Squadron 125 (VA-125) at Naval Air Station Lemoore, California.  In November 1964, he joined Attack Squadron 216 (VA-216), home based at NAS Lemoore.  The squadron was part of a carrier air wing aboard the aircraft carrier, which departed for Southeast Asia in November 1965. Galanti flew 97 combat missions in his A-4E Skyhawk before being shot down and captured on June 17, 1966. He remained a prisoner of war of the North Vietnamese for nearly seven years and was released on February 12, 1973.

Following rehabilitation at Naval Hospital Portsmouth, he was assigned to Naval Recruiting District Richmond in Richmond, Virginia as its new executive officer. In May 1976, he received a Master of Commerce degree (MBA) from the University of Richmond after two years of night school. He then became commanding officer of the Naval Recruiting District Richmond. In July 1979, he moved to Annapolis, to become part of the Office of the Commandant at the Naval Academy, which was responsible for the military and leadership training of over approximately 4000 academy midshipmen. Additionally, he became faculty advisor to the Brigade of Midshipmen Drum & Bugle Corps, the Lucky Bag (Academy yearbook), and the Midshipmen Honor Committee.

After being medically retired from the Navy in 1983, he became the first non-pharmacist executive director of the Virginia Pharmaceutical Association. Joining the Medical Society of Virginia staff in September 1991, Galanti became the executive vice president of the society on January 1, 1993. In both organizations, he used his computer expertise to vault them into the forefront nationally for association automation. In 2000, he was the Virginia campaign director for Senator John McCain's presidential bid.  In 2004, Galanti participated in the Swift Boat Veterans for Truth's ad campaign targeted at then-presidential contender John Kerry. He also worked with Senator McCain again on the senator's presidential bid in 2008.

He is the former president of the Virginia Aviation Foundation, the former president of the Science Museum of Virginia Foundation, the former president of Nam-POWs, a member of the national Vietnam POW Fraternity, and an elder at First Presbyterian Church in Richmond, Virginia. Additionally, he serves on the Secretary of Veterans Affairs' Advisory Committee on Former POWs. He is currently active in the American Ex-Prisoners of War service organization. The Virginia War Memorial in Richmond has an education wing named, "The Paul & Phyllis Galanti Education Center," where he serves as commissioner. In 2009, Paul was appointed as the 2nd commissioner of the Virginia Department of Veterans Service.

Recognition
Galanti's decorations from his time in the Navy include the Silver Star, combat awards of two Legions of Merit and the Bronze Star Medal, nine combat Air Medals, and two Purple Hearts. Galanti has appeared in several documentary films including the Discovery Channel's Emmy Award-winning "Vietnam POWs, Stories of Survival" and Public Television's "Return With Honor." He was also inducted into the Virginia Aviation Hall of Fame in November 2005 on the basis of his career, and a replica of his A-4C from VA-216 is on display at the Virginia Aviation Museum in Richmond. Galanti appeared on the covers of Life (October 20, 1967) and Newsweek (February 26, 1973) and in the August 19, 1999 issue of Time. Selling Power highlighted his success story in a six-page motivation section, "Never Give Up, Never Give In", in its May/June 1996 issue. It also chose him as one of the twelve outstanding motivators in the United States in September 1996.

References

External links
Swift Vets and POWs for Truth
Paul E. Galanti bio on Vietnam POW Home Page
Commissioner Galanti's bio on the Virginia Department of Veteran Services Page
The Paul & Phyllis Galanti Education Center

1939 births
Living people
Valley Forge Military Academy and College alumni
United States Naval Academy alumni
United States Navy officers
United States Naval Aviators
United States Navy personnel of the Vietnam War
Recipients of the Air Medal
Vietnam War prisoners of war
Recipients of the Silver Star
University of Richmond alumni
Recipients of the Legion of Merit
2004 United States presidential election
John Kerry